The Wellington Cup is a Group 3 Thoroughbred horse race in New Zealand held annually in late January at Trentham Racecourse in Trentham by the Wellington Racing Club.

History

Inaugurated in 1874, the Wellington Cup has been raced over various distances:

 2 miles : 1874-1889
  miles : 1890-1941
 2 miles : 1942-1973
 3200 metres : 1974-2008
 2400 metres : 2009-2015
 3200 metres : 2016 onwards

There were two prior Wellington Cups in 1867 and 1868. These were unofficial events run by the first Wellington Jockey Club and not recognised by the NZ Turf Register. 

The Wellington Cup is one of New Zealand's most famous and popular races and currently offers a purse of NZ$300,000 which belies its Group Three status.  Wellington Cup day attracts large crowds to Trentham Racecourse and the other races on the card include the Group One Thorndon Mile, the Group Three Desert Gold Stakes and the Douro Cup.  

The Wellington Cup was a Group 1 race until 2008. Given the prestige of the race, there was some disappointment at the news that the race would lose its Group One status from 2009. The Wellington Racing Club responded to the downgrade by reducing the distance to 2400 metres in order to attract a higher quality field.  The race reverted to 3200m from 2016 to help encourage New Zealand stayers. However, in 2017 the race was downgraded again to Group Three status.

Queen Elizabeth II attended in 1970.

One of the most famous winners of the Wellington Cup was Kiwi, ridden by Jimmy Cassidy.  The pair went on to win the 1983 Melbourne Cup for trainer, Snow Lupton of Waverley. Snow's grand-daughter Jaimee-Lee Lupton trained the 2020 Wellington Cup winner Soleseifei.  

In past years the Wellington Racing Club arranged celebrity guests of honour such as:
 Rachel Hunter and Rod Stewart in 1994.
 Sir Edmund Hillary was appropriately there to present the trophy to 1995 winner Ed along with Cheryl Ladd and One West Waikiki actor Richard Burgi.
 Jonah Lomu in 1996.
 Miss World winner Jacqueline Aguilera in 1997.

The 2023 Wellington Cup is the 150th edition of the race.

The biggest dividend paid for a Wellington Cup winner was $180 for Simon de Montfort, ridden by Brian Dodds in 1972.

Records
Speed record:
 3:15.59 - Daria's Fun (1988) for 3200 metres.
 3:16.2 - Il Tempo (1970) for the pre-1974 distance of 2 miles.
 2:26.65 - Maygrove (2015) over the 2400m journey raced from 2009 and 2015.

Most wins:
 3 - Cynisca (1890, 1891, 1892).
 3 - Great Sensation (1961, 1962, 1963).
 3 - Castletown (1991, 1992, 1994).

Most wins by a jockey:
 5 - Bob Skelton (1959, 1961, 1962, 1963, 1969).

Most wins by a trainer:
 4 - Michael Moroney (1996, 2000, 2014, 2016)

Winners of the Wellington Cup since 1960

Earlier winners

1959 - Ark Royal
1958 - Yeman
1957 - Sombrero
1956 - Fox Myth
1955 - Golden Galleon
1954 - Golden Tan
1953 - Crimson King
1952 - Reformed
1951 - Almora
1951 - Prawns
1950 - Beaumaris
1949 - Royal Tan
1948 - Spare Part
1947 - Bruce
1946 - Golden Souvenir
1945 - Lambourn
1944 - Don Quex
1943 - The Joker
1941 - Kindergarten
1941 - Happy Ending
1940 - Old Bill
1939 - Defaulter
1938 - Padishah
1937 - Ponty
1936 - Queen of Song
1935 - Vintage
1934 - Grand Jury
1933 - Royal Artist
1932 - Compris
1931 - Stanchion
1930 - Concentrate
1929 - Vertigern
1928 - Star Stranger
1927 - Rapier
1926 - Enthusiasm
1925 - Surveyor
1924 - Loughrea
1923 - Rapine
1922 - Insurrection
1921 - Maioha
1920 - Kilmoon
1919 - Red Ribbon
1919 - Rewi Poto
1919 - Oratress
1918 - Nobleman
1917 - Bunting
1916 - Bee
1915 - Pavlova
1914 - Kilrain
1913 - Sir Solo
1912 - Undecided
1911 - Miss Mischief
1910 - Crucinella
1909 - Blue Ribbon
1908 - Moloch
1907 - Achilles
1906 - Ropa
1905 - Nightfall
1904 - Gladsome
1904 - Convoy
1903 - Advance
1902 - St. Michael
1901 - Renown
1900 - Djin Djin
1899 - Daunt
1898 - Uniform
1897 - Strath Braan
1896 - Brooklet
1895 - Mahaki
1894 - Vogengang
1893 - Retina
1892 - Cynisca
1891 - Cynisca
1890 - Cynisca
1889 - Dudu
1888 - Beresford
1887 - Pasha
1886 - Nelson
1885 - Tasman
1884 - The Poet
1883 - Mischief
1882 - Hilda
1881 - Natator
1880 - Foul Play
1879 - Maritana
1878 - Lara
1877 - Guy Fawkes
1876 - Korari
1875 - Tambourini
1874 - Castaway
1868 - Numa
1867 - Policy

See also

 Recent winners of major NZ cup races
 Trentham Stakes
 New Zealand Cup
 Auckland Cup
 Thorndon Mile (raced on same day)
 Desert Gold Stakes (raced on same day)
 Telegraph Handicap
 Captain Cook Stakes

References

 Winners list at Thoroughbred Heritage
 Wellington Cup Day at Trentham Racecourse
 http://www.racenet.com.au
 http://www.nzracing.co.nz
 http://www.tab.co.nz
 http://www.racebase.co.nz
 The Great Decade of New Zealand racing 1970-1980. Glengarry, Jack. William Collins Publishers Ltd, Wellington, New Zealand.
 New Zealand Thoroughbred Racing Annual 2018 (47th edition). Dennis Ryan, Editor, Racing Media NZ Limited, Auckland, New Zealand.
 New Zealand Thoroughbred Racing Annual 2017 (46th edition). Dennis Ryan, Editor, Racing Media NZ Limited, Auckland, New Zealand.
 New Zealand Thoroughbred Racing Annual 2008 (37th edition). Bradford, David, Editor.  Bradford Publishing Limited, Paeroa, New Zealand.
 New Zealand Thoroughbred Racing Annual 2005 (34th edition). Bradford, David, Editor.  Bradford Publishing Limited, Paeroa, New Zealand.
 New Zealand Thoroughbred Racing Annual 2004 (33rd edition). Bradford, David, Editor.  Bradford Publishing Limited, Paeroa, New Zealand.
 New Zealand Thoroughbred Racing Annual 2000 (29th edition). Bradford, David, Editor.  Bradford Publishing Limited, Auckland, New Zealand.
 New Zealand Thoroughbred Racing Annual 1997  (26th edition). Dillon, Mike, Editor. Mike Dillon's Racing Enterprises Ltd, Auckland, New Zealand.
 New Zealand Thoroughbred Racing Annual 1995 (24th edition). Dillon, Mike, Editor. Mike Dillon's Racing Enterprises Ltd, Auckland, New Zealand.
 New Zealand Thoroughbred Racing Annual 1994 (23rd edition). Dillon, Mike, Editor. Meadowset Publishing, Auckland, New Zealand.
 New Zealand Thoroughbred Racing Annual 1991  (20th edition). Dillon, Mike, Editor. Moa Publications, Auckland, New Zealand.
 New Zealand Thoroughbred Racing Annual 1987 (16th edition). Dillon, Mike, Editor. Moa Publications, Auckland, New Zealand.
 New Zealand Thoroughbred Racing Annual 1985 (Fourteenth edition). Costello, John, Editor. Moa Publications, Auckland, New Zealand.
 New Zealand Thoroughbred Racing Annual 1984 (Thirteenth edition). Costello, John, Editor. Moa Publications, Auckland, New Zealand.
 New Zealand Thoroughbred Racing Annual 1982 (Eleventh edition). Costello, John, Editor. Moa Publications, Auckland, New Zealand.
 New Zealand Thoroughbred Racing Annual 1981 (Tenth edition). Costello, John, Editor. Moa Publications, Auckland, New Zealand.
 New Zealand Thoroughbred Racing Annual 1980 (Ninth edition). Costello, John, Editor. Moa Publications, Auckland, New Zealand.
 New Zealand Thoroughbred Racing Annual 1979 (Eighth edition).Costello, John, Editor. Moa Publications, Auckland, New Zealand.
 New Zealand Thoroughbred Racing Annual 1978 (Seventh edition).Costello, John, Editor. Moa Publications, Auckland, New Zealand.
 New Zealand Thoroughbred Racing Annual 1976. Costello, John, Editor. Moa Publications, Auckland.

Horse races in New Zealand
Open long distance horse races
Sport in Upper Hutt